Marie-Marguerite Carreaux de Rosemond, sometimes Carraux de Rozemont (died 1788) was a French painter.

Carreaux de Rosemond was a pupil of Adélaïde Labille-Guiard, one of the nine young women whose work was remarked upon at the Expositions de la jeunesse; she was singled out for praise by the critics alongside Marie-Gabrielle Capet and Mlle. Alexandre, and she and Capet were the two pupils chosen to be depicted in their teacher's Self-Portrait with Two Pupils, now in the Metropolitan Museum of Art. She may also be seen in a pen-and-ink sketch drawn by John Trumbull on a visit to Labille-Guiard's studio in 1786. Carreaux de Rosemond married engraver Charles Clément Balvay in 1788, but she died later that same year in the galleries of the Louvre as consequence of given birth. Her son also died soon after.

References

Year of birth unknown
1788 deaths
18th-century French painters
18th-century French women artists
French women painters
Pupils of Adélaïde Labille-Guiard